Sir Henry Goodricke, 2nd Baronet (1642–1705) was the son of Sir John Goodricke, 1st Baronet whom he succeeded in 1670. He inherited the family estate of Ribston Hall in North Yorkshire and in 1674 replaced the old house with a new mansion.

Career
Sir Henry Goodricke served almost continuously as Member of Parliament for Boroughbridge from 1673 until his death, with the exception of a period spent as British Envoy Extraordinary to Spain to Spain from 1679 to 1683.  During the Glorious Revolution of 1688, he acted as the Earl of Danby's lieutenant in the North in support of the revolution and was rewarded by the new regime with the office of Lieutenant-General of the Ordnance, a post which he held until 1702.

References
 
 
 J. D. Davies, 'Goodricke, Sir Henry, second baronet (1642–1705)', Oxford Dictionary of National Biography, Oxford University Press, September 2004; online edn, January 2008 , accessed 10 April 2009

1642 births
1705 deaths
Baronets in the Baronetage of England
Ambassadors of England to Spain
17th-century English diplomats
English MPs 1661–1679
English MPs 1679
English MPs 1685–1687
English MPs 1689–1690
English MPs 1690–1695
English MPs 1695–1698
English MPs 1698–1700
English MPs 1701
English MPs 1701–1702
English MPs 1702–1705